The Inspector General may refer to:

an alternate title of The Government Inspector, an 1842 play written by Nikolai Gogol
The Inspector General (1949 film), a comedy based on Gogol's play and starring Danny Kaye
The Inspector General (1933 film), a Czech historical comedy film based on Gogol's play

See also
Inspector general